Sharad Dada Bhimaji Sonawane is an Indian politician from Maharashtra.Sharad Bhimaji Sonavane is a first term Member of the Maharashtra Legislative Assembly from the Junnar  Assembly Constituency.

Maharashtra Legislative Assembly elections 2014
Sharaddada Bhimaji Sonavane won the Maharashtra Legislative Assembly elections 2014.

Political life
Sharad Bhimaji Sonavane was the member of  the Maharashtra Legislative Assembly from   Maharashtra Navanirman Sena. He was the only MLA of MNS who was elected in 2014 legislative assembly elections. He changed his party to shiv sena before the 2019 legislative assembly elections. He lost the election.

Positions held 
Maharashtra Legislative Assembly MLA
Terms in office:2014–2019.

References

Living people
Maharashtra Navnirman Sena politicians
Maharashtra MLAs 2014–2019
Marathi politicians
Year of birth missing (living people)